David Bernard Thompson (May 29, 1923 − November 24, 2013) was an American prelate of the Catholic Church. He served as Bishop of Charleston, South Carolina from 1990 to 1999.

Biography
Thompson was born in Philadelphia, Pennsylvania. After studying at St. Charles Borromeo Seminary in Wynnewood, he was ordained to the priesthood for the Philadelphia archdiocese on May 27, 1950.  He became a priest of the Allentown diocese (having been tapped for the post of chancellor) when it split from the Philadelphia archdiocese in 1961. His twin brother, Edward Thompson, had also been ordained a priest for the Philadelphia archdiocese.

On April 22, 1989 Thompson was appointed Coadjutor Bishop of Charleston, South Carolina by Pope John Paul II. He received his episcopal consecration on the following May 24 from Archbishop Pio Laghi, with Bishop Norbert Gaughan and Archbishop Eugene Marino, S.S.J., serving as co-consecrators. He assumed as his episcopal motto: Christi Impetus Pacis, meaning, "Working for the Peace of Christ."

Thompson later succeeded Ernest Leo Unterkoefler as the eleventh Bishop of Charleston upon the latter's resignation on February 22, 1990. His tenure was marked by the Synod of Charleston, which lasted from 1992 to 1995; it was the first diocesan synod held there since 1958.

Thompson resigned from his post as Bishop on July 12, 1999, after nine years of service and surpassing the mandatory retirement age of 75. He died on November 24, 2013 at the age of 90.

See also

 Catholic Church hierarchy
 Catholic Church in the United States
 Historical list of the Catholic bishops of the United States
 List of Catholic bishops of the United States
 Lists of patriarchs, archbishops, and bishops

References

External links
Roman Catholic Diocese of Charleston

1923 births
2013 deaths
Clergy from Philadelphia
St. Charles Borromeo Seminary alumni
Roman Catholic Archdiocese of Philadelphia
20th-century Roman Catholic bishops in the United States
Roman Catholic bishops of Charleston
Religious leaders from Pennsylvania